MetaMed Research was an American medical consulting firm aiming to provide personalized medical research services. It was founded in 2012 by Michael Vassar (previously of the Singularity Institute), Jaan Tallinn (co-founder of Skype and Kazaa), Zvi Mowshowitz, and Nevin Freeman with startup funding from Silicon Valley investor Peter Thiel. MetaMed stated that its researchers were drawn from top universities, as well as prominent technology companies such as Google. Many of its principals were associated with the Rationalist movement.

Concept
Vassar founded MetaMed to apply the principles of rationality as taught by Eliezer Yudkowsky to medicine, having left Yudkowsky's Singularity Institute to do so. MetaMed was intended to provide an alternative to typical healthcare by providing higher quality research. Vassar explained,

Services
Company researchers gathered detailed medical information on each client, using this as the basis for the creation of personalized research reports for various conditions (or, in some cases, for the purpose of client performance enhancement). It also assessed the expected value of various tests, and created maps of correlations between possible medical conditions. One aim of the company was to aid doctors with advanced artificial intelligence and data from information experts.

MetaMed's personalized medical research services were targeted at the market for concierge medicine, with prices ranging from a few thousand dollars to hundreds of thousands.

Termination
By 2015, MetaMed was defunct, which Tallinn attributed to the difficulty of producing research results and limited interest from consumers.

References

Defunct health care companies of the United States
American transhumanists